Don Hall is an American sound editor. He won two Primetime Emmy Awards and was nominated for three more in the category Outstanding Sound Editing for his work on the television program Voyage to the Bottom of the Sea and also the television films Tribes, Eleanor and Franklin and Standing Tall. Hall was also honored an Academy Award for the John A. Bonner Medal of Commendation.

References

External links 

Living people
Place of birth missing (living people)
Year of birth missing (living people)
American sound editors
Primetime Emmy Award winners
Best Sound BAFTA Award winners